Sunbeamland is the name for a manufacturing complex close to the centre of Wolverhampton, near England's "Black Country". Sunbeamland is where John Marston, a design engineer and entrepreneur, developed several large clusters of factory buildings.  The name "Sunbeamland" is derived from the Sunbeam range of motorcycles. A mile south of Sunbeamland, in Blakenhall, lies the Sunbeam Motor Car Company and Villiers Engineering, which became two of Wolverhampton's most important industries.

Sunbeamland - Sunbeam Cycle Works

Sunbeamland was John Marston Limited's bicycle and motorcycle factory on Wolverhampton's Paul Street fronting onto the Penn Road island now that the other side of the street has been cleared. They were built on the site of Edward Perry's Jeddo Works, which Marston had bought from Perry's estate in 1871.

The building, disused since the late 1990s, was declined Listed Building status by English Heritage but Wolverhampton City Council provided their own local 'listed' status.  Work has since begun to convert the building into apartments.

Villiers Engineering Works - Blakenhall

Villiers Engineering's first premises were a mile south of Sunbeamland in Blakenhall. They had been Edward Bullifant's Blakenhall Tin and Japan works premises on the east side of Upper Villiers Street close to St Luke's church. They were bought by John Marston in 1898 to house a new business to be run by Marston's son to make components for Sunbeam cycles. The son bought the business from his father in 1902. Just before the First World War they began to make small two-stroke petrol engines.

Sunbeam Motor Car Company - Moorfield Works Blakenhall

Moorfield Works, the new buildings built in 1905 on the site of Moorfield House for the new Sunbeam Motor Car Company. The house and its grounds bought by Marston in 1898 were on the southern boundary of the first Villiers Engineering premises. The first Sunbeam car was built in the house's old stables. The works are on the opposite side of Upper Villiers Street.

References

External links

 1920s Sunbeamland Wolverhampton City Council. Pool Street to the left, Paul Street straight ahead
 Wolverhampton's locally listed buildings

Buildings and structures in Wolverhampton
Sunbeam motorcycles
Sunbeam Motor Car Company